A caliphate or khilāfah is an institution or public office under the leadership of an Islamic steward with the title of caliph, a person considered a political-religious successor to the Islamic prophet Muhammad and a leader of the entire Muslim world (ummah). Historically, the caliphates were polities based on Islam which developed into multi-ethnic trans-national empires. During the medieval period, three major caliphates succeeded each other: the Rashidun Caliphate (632–661), the Umayyad Caliphate (661–750), and the Abbasid Caliphate (750–1258). In the fourth major caliphate, the Ottoman Caliphate, the rulers of the Ottoman Empire claimed caliphal authority from 1517. Throughout the history of Islam, a few other Muslim states, almost all hereditary monarchies such as the Mamluk Sultanate (Cairo) and Ayyubid Caliphate, have claimed to be caliphates.

The first caliphate, the Rashidun Caliphate, was established in 632 immediately after Muhammad's death. It was followed by the Umayyad Caliphate and the Abbasid Caliphate. The last caliphate, the Ottoman Caliphate, existed until it was abolished in 1924 by the Turkish Republic. Not all Muslim states have had caliphates, and only a minority of Muslims recognise any particular caliph as legitimate in the first place. The Sunni branch of Islam stipulates that, as a head of state, a caliph should be elected by Muslims or their representatives. Followers of Shia Islam, however, believe a caliph should be an Imam chosen by God from the Ahl al-Bayt (the "Household of the Prophet").

In the early 21st century, following the failure of the Arab Spring and related protests, some have argued for a return to the concept of a caliphate to better unify Muslims. The caliphate system was abolished in Turkey in 1924 during the secularisation of Turkey as part of Atatürk's Reforms.

Etymology 
Before the advent of Islam, Arabian monarchs traditionally used the title malik (King, ruler), or another from the same root.

The term caliph, derives from the Arabic word , which means "successor", "steward", or "deputy" and has traditionally been considered a shortening of Khalīfat Rasūl Allāh ("successor of the messenger of God"). However, studies of pre-Islamic texts suggest that the original meaning of the phrase was "successor selected by God".

History

Rashidun Caliphate (632–661)

Succession to Muhammad
 
In the immediate aftermath of the death of Muhammad, a gathering of the Ansar (natives of Medina) took place in the Saqifah (courtyard) of the Banu Sa'ida clan. The general belief at the time was that the purpose of the meeting was for the Ansar to decide on a new leader of the Muslim community among themselves, with the intentional exclusion of the Muhajirun (migrants from Mecca), though this has later become the subject of debate.

Nevertheless, Abu Bakr and Umar, both prominent companions of Muhammad, upon learning of the meeting became concerned of a potential coup and hastened to the gathering. Upon arriving, Abu Bakr addressed the assembled men with a warning that an attempt to elect a leader outside of Muhammad's own tribe, the Quraysh, would likely result in dissension as only they can command the necessary respect among the community. He then took Umar and another companion, Abu Ubaidah ibn al-Jarrah, by the hand and offered them to the Ansar as potential choices. He was countered with the suggestion that the Quraysh and the Ansar choose a leader each from among themselves, who would then rule jointly. The group grew heated upon hearing this proposal and began to argue amongst themselves. Umar hastily took Abu Bakr's hand and swore his own allegiance to the latter, an example followed by the gathered men.

Abu Bakr was near-universally accepted as head of the Muslim community (under the title of caliph) as a result of Saqifah, though he did face contention as a result of the rushed nature of the event. Several companions, most prominent among them being Ali ibn Abi Talib, initially refused to acknowledge his authority. Ali may have been reasonably expected to assume leadership, being both cousin and son-in-law to Muhammad. The theologian Ibrahim al-Nakha'i stated that Ali also had support among the Ansar for his succession, explained by the genealogical links he shared with them. Whether his candidacy for the succession was raised during Saqifah is unknown, though it is not unlikely. Abu Bakr later sent Umar to confront Ali to gain his allegiance, resulting in an altercation which may have involved violence. However, after six months the group made peace with Abu Bakr and Ali offered him his fealty.

Rāshidun Caliphs 

Abu Bakr nominated Umar as his successor on his deathbed. Umar, the second caliph, was killed by a Persian slave called Abu Lu'lu'a Firuz. His successor, Uthman, was elected by a council of electors (majlis). Uthman was killed by members of a disaffected group. Ali then took control but was not universally accepted as caliph by the governors of Egypt and later by some of his own guard. He faced two major rebellions and was assassinated by Abd-al-Rahman ibn Muljam, a Khawarij. Ali's tumultuous rule lasted only five years. This period is known as the Fitna, or the first Islamic civil war. The followers of Ali later became the Shi'a ("shiaat Ali", partisans of Ali.) minority sect of Islam and reject the legitimacy of the first three caliphs. The followers of all four Rāshidun Caliphs (Abu Bakr, Umar, Uthman and Ali) became the majority Sunni sect.

Under the Rāshidun each region (Sultanate, Wilayah, or Emirate) of the caliphate had its own governor (Sultan, Wāli or Emir). Muāwiyah, a relative of Uthman and governor (wali) of Syria, succeeded Ali as caliph. Muāwiyah transformed the caliphate into a hereditary office, thus founding the Umayyad dynasty.

In areas which were previously under Sasanian Empire or Byzantine rule, the caliphs lowered taxes, provided greater local autonomy (to their delegated governors), greater religious freedom for Jews, and some indigenous Christians, and brought peace to peoples demoralised and disaffected by the casualties and heavy taxation that resulted from the decades of Byzantine-Persian warfare.

Ali's caliphate, Hasan and the rise of the Umayyad dynasty
Ali's reign was plagued by turmoil and internal strife. The Persians, taking advantage of this, infiltrated the two armies and attacked the other army causing chaos and internal hatred between the companions at the Battle of Siffin. The battle lasted several months, resulting in a stalemate. In order to avoid further bloodshed, Ali agreed to negotiate with Mu'awiyah. This caused a faction of approximately 4,000 people, who would come to be known as the Kharijites, to abandon the fight. After defeating the Kharijites at the Battle of Nahrawan, Ali was later assassinated by the Kharijite Ibn Muljam. Ali's son Hasan was elected as the next caliph, but abdicated in favour of Mu'awiyah a few months later to avoid any conflict within the Muslims. Mu'awiyah became the sixth caliph, establishing the Umayyad dynasty, named after the great-grandfather of Uthman and Mu'awiyah, Umayya ibn Abd Shams.

Umayyad Caliphate (661–750)

Beginning with the Umayyads, the title of the caliph became hereditary. Under the Umayyads, the caliphate grew rapidly in territory, incorporating the Caucasus, Transoxiana, Sindh, the Maghreb and most of the Iberian Peninsula (Al-Andalus) into the Muslim world. At its greatest extent, the Umayyad Caliphate covered 5.17 million square miles (13,400,000 km2), making it the largest empire the world had yet seen and the sixth largest ever to exist in history.

Geographically, the empire was divided into several provinces, the borders of which changed numerous times during the Umayyad reign. Each province had a governor appointed by the caliph. However, for a variety of reasons, including that they were not elected by Shura and suggestions of impious behaviour, the Umayyad dynasty was not universally supported within the Muslim community. Some supported prominent early Muslims like Zubayr ibn al-Awwam; others felt that only members of Muhammad's clan, the Banu Hashim, or his own lineage, the descendants of Ali, should rule.

There were numerous rebellions against the Umayyads, as well as splits within the Umayyad ranks (notably, the rivalry between Yaman and Qays). At the command of Yazid son of Muawiya, an army led by Umar ibn Saad, a commander by the name of Shimr Ibn Thil-Jawshan killed Ali's son Hussein and his family at the Battle of Karbala in 680, solidifying the Shia-Sunni split. Eventually, supporters of the Banu Hashim and the supporters of the lineage of Ali united to bring down the Umayyads in 750. However, the Shi‘at ‘Alī, "the Party of Ali", were again disappointed when the Abbasid dynasty took power, as the Abbasids were descended from Muhammad's uncle, ‘Abbas ibn ‘Abd al-Muttalib and not from Ali.

Abbasid Caliphate (750–1517)

Abbasid Caliphs at Baghdad 

In 750, the Umayyad dynasty was overthrown by another family of Meccan origin, the Abbasids. Their time represented a scientific, cultural and religious flowering. Islamic art and music also flourished significantly during their reign. Their major city and capital Baghdad began to flourish as a center of knowledge, culture and trade. This period of cultural fruition ended in 1258 with the sack of Baghdad by the Mongols under Hulagu Khan. The Abbasid Caliphate had however lost its effective power outside Iraq already by c. 920. By 945, the loss of power became official when the Buyids conquered Baghdad and all of Iraq. The empire fell apart and its parts were ruled for the next century by local dynasties.

In the 9th century, the Abbasids created an army loyal only to their caliphate, composed predominantly of Turkic Cuman, Circassian and Georgian slave origin known as Mamluks. By 1250 the Mamluks came to power in Egypt. The Mamluk army, though often viewed negatively, both helped and hurt the caliphate. Early on, it provided the government with a stable force to address domestic and foreign problems. However, creation of this foreign army and al-Mu'tasim's transfer of the capital from Baghdad to Samarra created a division between the caliphate and the peoples they claimed to rule. In addition, the power of the Mamluks steadily grew until Ar-Radi (934–41) was constrained to hand over most of the royal functions to Muhammad ibn Ra'iq.

Under the Mamluk Sultanate of Cairo (1261–1517) 

In 1261, following the Mongol conquest of Baghdad, the Mamluk rulers of Egypt tried to gain legitimacy for their rule by declaring the re-establishment of the Abbasid caliphate in Cairo. The Abbasid caliphs in Egypt had little political power; they continued to maintain the symbols of authority, but their sway was confined to religious matters. The first Abbasid caliph of Cairo was Al-Mustansir (r. June–November 1261). The Abbasid caliphate of Cairo lasted until the time of Al-Mutawakkil III, who ruled as caliph from 1508 to 1516, then he was deposed briefly in 1516 by his predecessor Al-Mustamsik, but was restored again to the caliphate in 1517.

The Ottoman Great Sultan Selim I defeated the Mamluk Sultanate and made Egypt part of the Ottoman Empire in 1517. Al-Mutawakkil III was captured together with his family and transported to Constantinople as a prisoner where he had a ceremonial role. He died in 1543, following his return to Cairo.

Parallel regional caliphates in the later Abbasid Era 
The Abbasid dynasty lost effective power over much of the Muslim realm by the first half of the tenth century.

The Umayyad dynasty, which had survived and come to rule over Al-Andalus, reclaimed the title of caliph in 929, lasting until it was overthrown in 1031.

Umayyad Caliphate of Córdoba (929–1031) 

During the Umayyad dynasty, the Iberian Peninsula was an integral province of the Umayyad Caliphate ruling from Damascus. The Umayyads lost the position of caliph in Damascus in 750, and Abd al-Rahman I became Emir of Córdoba in 756 after six years in exile. Intent on regaining power, he defeated the existing Islamic rulers of the area who defied Umayyad rule and united various local fiefdoms into an emirate.

Rulers of the emirate used the title "emir" or "sultan" until the 10th century, when Abd al-Rahman III was faced with the threat of invasion by the Fatimid Caliphate. To aid his fight against the invading Fatimids, who claimed the caliphate in opposition to the generally recognised Abbasid caliph of Baghdad, Al-Mu'tadid, Abd al-Rahman III claimed the title of caliph himself. This helped Abd al-Rahman III gain prestige with his subjects, and the title was retained after the Fatimids were repulsed. The rule of the caliphate is considered as the heyday of Muslim presence in the Iberian Peninsula, before it fragmented into various taifas in the 11th century. This period was characterised by a flourishing in technology, trade and culture; many of the buildings of al-Andalus were constructed in this period.

Almohad Caliphate (1147–1269) 

The Almohad Caliphate (from Arabic  , "the Monotheists" or "the Unifiers") was a Moroccan Berber Muslim movement founded in the 12th century.

The Almohad movement was started by Ibn Tumart among the Masmuda tribes of southern Morocco. The Almohads first established a Berber state in Tinmel in the Atlas Mountains in roughly 1120. The Almohads succeeded in overthrowing the Almoravid dynasty in governing Morocco by 1147, when Abd al-Mu'min (r. 1130–1163) conquered Marrakech and declared himself caliph. They then extended their power over all of the Maghreb by 1159. Al-Andalus followed the fate of Africa, and all Islamic Iberia was under Almohad rule by 1172.

The Almohad dominance of Iberia continued until 1212, when Muhammad al-Nasir (1199–1214) was defeated at the Battle of Las Navas de Tolosa in the Sierra Morena by an alliance of the Christian princes of Castile, Aragon, Navarre and Portugal. Nearly all of the Moorish dominions in Iberia were lost soon after, with the great Moorish cities of Córdoba and Seville falling to the Christians in 1236 and 1248, respectively.

The Almohads continued to rule in northern Africa until the piecemeal loss of territory through the revolt of tribes and districts enabled the rise of their most effective enemies, the Marinid dynasty, in 1215. The last representative of the line, Idris al-Wathiq, was reduced to the possession of Marrakesh, where he was murdered by a slave in 1269; the Marinids seized Marrakesh, ending the Almohad domination of the Western Maghreb.

Fatimid Caliphate (909–1171) 

The Fatimid Caliphate was an Isma'ili Shi'i caliphate, originally based in Tunisia, that extended its rule across the Mediterranean coast of Africa and ultimately made Egypt the centre of its caliphate. At its height, in addition to Egypt, the caliphate included varying areas of the Maghreb, Sicily, the Levant and the Hejaz.

The Fatimids established the Tunisian city of Mahdia and made it their capital city, before conquering Egypt and building the city of Cairo there in 969. Thereafter, Cairo became the capital of the caliphate, with Egypt becoming the political, cultural and religious centre of the state. Islam scholar Louis Massignon dubbed the 4th century AH /10th century CE as the "Ismaili century in the history of Islam".

The term Fatimite is sometimes used to refer to the citizens of this caliphate. The ruling elite of the state belonged to the Ismaili branch of Shi'ism. The leaders of the dynasty were Ismaili imams and had a religious significance to Ismaili Muslims. They are also part of the chain of holders of the office of the caliphate, as recognised by some Muslims. Therefore, this constitutes a rare period in history in which the descendants of Ali (hence the name Fatimid, referring to Ali's wife Fatima) and the caliphate were united to any degree, excepting the final period of the Rashidun Caliphate under Ali himself.

The caliphate was reputed to exercise a degree of religious tolerance towards non-Ismaili sects of Islam as well as towards Jews, Maltese Christians and Copts.

The Shiʻa Ubayd Allah al-Mahdi Billah of the Fatimid dynasty, who claimed descent from Muhammad through his daughter, claimed the title of caliph in 909, creating a separate line of caliphs in North Africa. Initially controlling Algeria, Tunisia and Libya, the Fatimid caliphs extended their rule for the next 150 years, taking Egypt and Palestine, before the Abbasid dynasty was able to turn the tide, limiting Fatimid rule to Egypt. The Fatimid dynasty finally ended in 1171 and was overtaken by Saladin of the Ayyubid dynasty.

Ayyubid Caliphate (1171–1260) 

However, Saladin himself has been a widely celebrated caliph in Islamic history.

Ottoman Caliphate (1517–1924) 

The caliphate was claimed by the sultans of the Ottoman Empire beginning with Murad I (reigned 1362 to 1389), while recognising no authority on the part of the Abbasid caliphs of the Mamluk-ruled Cairo. Hence the seat of the caliphate moved to the Ottoman capital of Edirne. In 1453, after Mehmed the Conqueror's conquest of Constantinople, the seat of the Ottomans moved to Constantinople, present-day Istanbul. In 1517, the Ottoman sultan Selim I defeated and annexed the Mamluk Sultanate of Cairo into his empire. Through conquering and unifying Muslim lands, Selim I became the defender of the Holy Cities of Mecca and Medina, which further strengthened the Ottoman claim to the caliphate in the Muslim world. Ottomans gradually came to be viewed as the de facto leaders and representatives of the Islamic world. However, the earlier Ottoman caliphs did not officially bear the title of caliph in their documents of state, inscriptions, or coinage. It was only in the late eighteenth century that the claim to the caliphate was discovered by the sultans to have a practical use, since it allowed them to counter Russian claims to protect Ottoman Christians with their own claim to protect Muslims under Russian rule.

The outcome of the Russo-Turkish War of 1768–1774 was disastrous for the Ottomans. Large territories, including those with large Muslim populations, such as Crimea, were lost to the Russian Empire. However, the Ottomans under Abdul Hamid I claimed a diplomatic victory by being allowed to remain the religious leaders of Muslims in the now-independent Crimea as part of the peace treaty; in return Russia became the official protector of Christians in Ottoman territory. According to Barthold, the first time the title of "caliph" was used as a political instead of symbolic religious title by the Ottomans was the Treaty of Küçük Kaynarca with the Russian Empire in 1774, when the Empire retained moral authority on territory whose sovereignty was ceded to the Russian Empire.

The British supported and propagated the view that the Ottomans were caliphs of Islam among Muslims in British India, and the Ottoman sultans helped the British by issuing pronouncements to the Muslims of India telling them to support British rule from Sultan Ali III and Sultan Abdülmecid I.

Around 1880 Sultan Abdul Hamid II reasserted the title as a way of countering Russian expansion into Muslim lands. His claim was most fervently accepted by the Muslims of British India. By the eve of World War I, the Ottoman state, despite its weakness relative to Europe, represented the largest and most powerful independent Islamic political entity. The sultan also enjoyed some authority beyond the borders of his shrinking empire as caliph of Muslims in Egypt, India and Central Asia.

In 1899 John Hay, U.S. Secretary of State, asked the American ambassador to Ottoman Turkey, Oscar Straus, to approach Sultan Abdul Hamid II to use his position as caliph to order the Tausūg people of the Sultanate of Sulu in the Philippines to submit to American suzerainty and American military rule; the Sultan obliged them and wrote the letter which was sent to Sulu via Mecca. As a result, the "Sulu Mohammedans ... refused to join the insurrectionists and had placed themselves under the control of our army, thereby recognizing American sovereignty."

Abolition of the Caliphate (1924)

After the Armistice of Mudros of October 1918 with the military occupation of Constantinople and Treaty of Versailles (1919), the position of the Ottomans was uncertain. The movement to protect or restore the Ottomans gained force after the Treaty of Sèvres (August 1920) which imposed the partitioning of the Ottoman Empire and gave Greece a powerful position in Anatolia, to the distress of the Turks. They called for help and the movement was the result. The movement had collapsed by late 1922.

On 3 March 1924, the first president of the Turkish Republic, Mustafa Kemal Atatürk, as part of his reforms, constitutionally abolished the institution of the caliphate. Atatürk offered the caliphate to Ahmed Sharif as-Senussi, on the condition that he reside outside Turkey; Senussi declined the offer and confirmed his support for Abdulmejid. The title was then claimed by Hussein bin Ali, Sharif of Mecca and Hejaz, leader of the Arab Revolt, but his kingdom was defeated and annexed by ibn Saud in 1925.

Egyptian scholar Ali Abdel Raziq published his 1925 book Islam and the Foundations of Governance. The argument of this book has been summarised as "Islam does not advocate a specific form of government". He focussed his criticism both at those who use religious law as contemporary political proscription and at the history of rulers claiming legitimacy by the caliphate. Raziq wrote that past rulers spread the notion of religious justification for the caliphate "so that they could use religion as a shield protecting their thrones against the attacks of rebels".

A summit was convened at Cairo in 1926 to discuss the revival of the caliphate, but most Muslim countries did not participate, and no action was taken to implement the summit's resolutions. Though the title Ameer al-Mumineen was adopted by the King of Morocco and by Mohammed Omar, former head of the Taliban of Afghanistan, neither claimed any legal standing or authority over Muslims outside the borders of their respective countries.

Since the end of the Ottoman Empire, occasional demonstrations have been held calling for the re-establishment of the caliphate. Organisations which call for the re-establishment of the caliphate include Hizb ut-Tahrir and the Muslim Brotherhood.

Parallel regional caliphates to the Ottomans

Indian subcontinent

After the Umayyad campaigns in India and the conquest on small territories of the western part of the Indian peninsula, early Indian Muslim dynasties were founded by the Ghurid dynasty and the Ghaznavids, most notably the Delhi Sultanate. The Indian sultanates did not extensively strive for a caliphate since the Ottoman Empire was already observing the caliphate. Although the Mughal Empire is not recognised as a caliphate, its sixth emperor Muhammad Alamgir Aurangzeb has often been regarded as one of the few Islamic caliphs to have ruled the Indian peninsula. He received support from Ottoman Sultans such as Suleiman II and Mehmed IV. As a memoriser of Quran, Aurangzeb fully established sharia in South Asia via his Fatawa 'Alamgiri. He re-introduced jizya and banned Islamically unlawful activities. However, Aurangzeb's personal expenses were covered by his own incomes, which included the sewing of caps and trade of his written copies of the Quran. Thus, he has been compared to the second caliph, Umar bin Khattab, and Kurdish conqueror Saladin. Other notable rulers such as Muhammad bin Bakhtiyar Khalji, Alauddin Khilji, Firuz Shah Tughlaq, Shamsuddin Ilyas Shah, Babur, Sher Shah Suri, Nasir I of Kalat, Tipu Sultan, and the Nawabs of Bengal were popularly given the term khalifa.

Bornu Caliphate (1472–1893)
The Bornu Caliphate, which was headed by the Bornu emperors, began in 1472. A rump state of the larger Kanem-Bornu Empire, its rulers held the title of caliph until 1893, when it was absorbed into the British Colony of Nigeria and Northern Cameroons Protectorate. The British recognised them as the 'sultans of Bornu', one step down in Muslim royal titles. After Nigeria became independent, its rulers became the 'emirs of Bornu', another step down.

Yogyakarta Caliphate (1755–2015)
The Indonesian Sultan of Yogyakarta historically used Khalifatullah (Caliph of God) as one of his many titles. In 2015 sultan Hamengkubuwono X renounced any claim to the caliphate in order to facilitate his daughter's inheritance of the throne, as the theological opinion of the time was that a woman may hold the secular office of sultan but not the spiritual office of caliph.

Sokoto Caliphate (1804–1903)

The Sokoto Caliphate was an Islamic state in what is now Nigeria led by Usman dan Fodio. Founded during the Fulani War in the early 19th century, it controlled one of the most powerful empires in sub-Saharan Africa prior to European conquest and colonisation. The caliphate remained extant through the colonial period and afterwards, though with reduced power. The current head of the Sokoto Caliphate is Sa'adu Abubakar.

Toucouleur Empire (1848–1893)
The Toucouleur Empire, also known as the Tukular Empire, was one of the Fulani jihad states in sub-saharan Africa. It was eventually pacified and annexed by the French Republic, being incorporated into French West Africa.

Khilafat Movement (1919–1924)

The Khilafat Movement was launched by Muslims in British India in 1920 to defend the Ottoman Caliphate at the end of the First World War and it spread throughout the British colonial territories. It was strong in British India where it formed a rallying point for some Indian Muslims as one of many anti-British Indian political movements. Its leaders included Mohammad Ali Jouhar, his brother Shawkat Ali and Maulana Abul Kalam Azad, Dr. Mukhtar Ahmed Ansari, Hakim Ajmal Khan and Barrister Muhammad Jan Abbasi. For a time it was supported by Mohandas Karamchand Gandhi, who was a member of the Central Khilafat Committee. However, the movement lost its momentum after the abolition of the caliphate in 1924. After further arrests and flight of its leaders, and a series of offshoots splintered off from the main organisation, the Movement eventually died down and disbanded.

Sharifian Caliphate (1924–25) 

The Sharifian Caliphate was an Arab caliphate proclaimed by the Sharifian rulers of Hejaz in 1924 previously known as Vilayet Hejaz, declaring independence from the Ottoman Caliphate. The idea of the Sharifian Caliphate had been floating around since at least the 15th century. Toward the end of the 19th century, it started to gain importance due to the decline of the Ottoman Empire, which was heavily defeated in the Russo-Turkish War of 1877–78. There is little evidence, however, that the idea of a Sharifian Caliphate ever gained wide grassroots support in the Middle East or anywhere else in the Muslim world.

Non-political caliphates
Though non-political, some Sufi orders and the Ahmadiyya movement define themselves as caliphates. Their leaders are thus commonly referred to as khalifas (caliphs).

Sufi caliphates
In Sufism, tariqas (orders) are led by spiritual leaders (khilafah ruhaniyyah), the main khalifas, who nominate local khalifas to organise zaouias.

Sufi caliphates are not necessarily hereditary. Khalifas are aimed to serve the silsilah in relation to spiritual responsibilities and to propagate the teachings of the tariqa.

Ahmadiyya Caliphate (1908–present)

The Ahmadiyya Muslim Community is a self-proclaimed Islamic revivalist movement founded in 1889 by Mirza Ghulam Ahmad of Qadian, India, who claimed to be the promised Messiah and Mahdi, awaited by Muslims. He also claimed to be a follower-prophet subordinate to Muhammad, the prophet of Islam. The group are traditionally shunned by the majority of Muslims.

After Ahmad's death in 1908, his first successor, Hakeem Noor-ud-Din, became the caliph of the community and assumed the title of Khalifatul Masih (Successor or Caliph of the Messiah). After Hakeem Noor-ud-Din, the first caliph, the title of the Ahmadiyya caliph continued under Mirza Mahmud Ahmad, who led the community for over 50 years. Following him were Mirza Nasir Ahmad and then Mirza Tahir Ahmad who were the third and fourth caliphs respectively. The current caliph is Mirza Masroor Ahmad, who lives in London.

Period of dormancy 

Once the subject of intense conflict and rivalry amongst Muslim rulers, the caliphate lay dormant and largely unclaimed since the 1920s. For the vast majority of Muslims, the caliph, as leader of the ummah, "is cherished both as memory and ideal" as a time when Muslims "enjoyed scientific and military superiority globally". The Islamic prophet Muhammad is reported to have prophesied:

"Kalifatstaat": Federated Islamic State of Anatolia (1994–2001)
The Kalifatstaat ("Caliphate State") was the name of an Islamist organisation in Germany that was proclaimed at an event in Cologne in 1994 and banned in December 2001 after an amendment to the Association Act, which abolished the religious privilege. However, this caliphate was never institutionalised under international law, but only an intention for an Islamic "state within the state".

The caliphate emerged in 1994 from the "Federated Islamic State of Anatolia" (AFİD), which existed in Germany from 1992 to 1994 as the renaming of the Association of Islamic Associations and Municipalities (İCCB). In 1984 the latter split off from the Islamist organisation Millî Görüş. The leader of the association proclaimed himself the caliph, the worldwide spiritual and worldly head of all Muslims. Since then, the organisation has seen itself as a "Caliphate State". From an association law perspective, the old name remained.

The leader was initially Cemalettin Kaplan, who was nicknamed "Khomeini of Cologne" by the German public. In Turkish media he was referred to as the "Dark Voice". At an event in honour of Kaplan in 1993, the German convert to Islam Andreas Abu Bakr Rieger publicly "regretted" in front of hundreds of listeners that the Germans had not completely destroyed the Jews: "Like the Turks, we Germans have often had a good cause in history fought, although I have to admit that my grandfathers weren't thorough with our main enemy."

Abu Issa caliphate (1993 – circa 2014)
A contemporary effort to re-establish the caliphate by supporters of armed jihad that predates Abu Bakr al-Baghdadi and the Islamic State and was much less successful, was "the forgotten caliphate" of Muhammad bin ʿIssa bin Musa al Rifaʿi ("known to his followers as Abu ʿIssa"). This "microcaliphate" was founded on 3 April 1993 on the Pakistan-Afghanistan border, when Abu Issa's small number of "Afghan Arabs" followers swore loyalty (bay'ah) to him. Abu Issa, was born in the city of Zarqa, Jordan and like his followers had come to Afghanistan to wage jihad against the Soviets. Unlike them he had ancestors in the tribe of Quraysh, a traditional requirement for a caliph. The caliphate was ostensibly an attempt to unite the many other jihadis who were not his followers and who were quarrelling amongst each other. It was not successful. Abu Issa's efforts to compel them to unite under his command were met "with mockery and then force". Local Afghans also despised him and his followers. Like the later Islamic State he tried to abolition of infidel currency and rejected nationalism.   According to scholar Kevin Jackson, 
"Abu ʿIssa issued 'sad and funny' fatwas, as Abu al-Walid puts it, notably sanctioning the use of drugs. A nexus had been forged between [Abu Issa's group] and local drug smugglers. (The fatwa led one jihadist author to dismiss Abu Issa as the 'caliph of the Muslims among drug traffickers and takfir') Abu ʿIssa also prohibited the use of paper currency and ordered his men to burn their passports."
The territory under his control "did not extend beyond a few small towns" in Afghanistan's Kunar province. Eventually he did not even control this area after the Taliban took it over in the late 1990s. The caliphate then moved to London, where they "preaching to a mostly skeptical jihadi intelligentsia about the obligation of establishing a caliphate". They succeeded in attracting some jihadis (Yahya al-Bahrumi, Abu Umar al Kuwaiti) who later joined the Islamic State. Abu Issa died in 2014, "after spending most of his final years in prison in London" Abu Umar al Kuwaiti became a judge for the Islamic state but was later executed for extremism after he "took takfir to new levels... pronouncing death sentences for apostasy on those who were ignorant of scripture – and then pronouncing takfir on those too reluctant to pronounce takfir."

Islamic State (2014–present)

The group Tanzim Qaidat al-Jihad fi Bilad al-Rafidayn (Al-Qaeda in Iraq) formed as an affiliate of Al-Qaeda network of Islamist militants during the Iraq War. The group eventually expanded into Syria and rose to prominence as the Islamic State of Iraq and the Levant (ISIL) during the Syrian Civil War. In the summer of 2014, the group launched the Northern Iraq offensive, seizing the city of Mosul. The group declared itself a caliphate under Abu Bakr al-Baghdadi on 29 June 2014 and renamed itself as the "Islamic State". ISIL's claim to be the highest authority of Muslims has been widely rejected. No prominent Muslim scholar has supported its declaration of caliphate; even Salafi-jihadist preachers accused the group of engaging in political showmanship and bringing disrepute to the notion of Islamic state.

ISIL has been at war with armed forces including the Iraqi Army, the Syrian Army, the Free Syrian Army, Al-Nusra Front, Syrian Democratic Forces, and Iraqi Kurdistan's Peshmerga and People's Protection Units (YPG) along with a 60 nation coalition in its efforts to establish a de facto state on Iraqi and Syrian territory. At its height in 2014, the Islamic State held "about a third of Syria and 40 percent of Iraq". By December 2017 it had lost 95% of that territory, including Mosul, Iraq's second largest city, and the northern Syrian city of Raqqa, its "capital". It's caliph, Al-Baghdadi, was killed in a raid by U.S. forces on 26 October 2019, its "last holdout", the town of Al-Baghuz Fawqani, fell to Syrian Democratic Forces on 23 March 2019.

Ahmadiyya view

The members of the Ahmadiyya community believe that the Ahmadiyya Caliphate (Arabic: Khilāfah) is the continuation of the Islamic caliphate, first being the Rāshidūn (rightly guided) Caliphate (of Righteous Caliphs). This is believed to have been suspended with Ali, the son-in-law of Muhammad and re-established with the appearance of Mirza Ghulam Ahmad (1835–1908, the founder of the movement) whom Ahmadis identify as the Promised Messiah and Mahdi.

Ahmadis maintain that in accordance with Quranic verses (such as ) and numerous ahadith on the issue, Khilāfah can only be established by God Himself and is a divine blessing given to those who believe and work righteousness and uphold the unity of God, therefore any movement to establish the Khilāfah centered on human endeavours alone is bound to fail, particularly when the condition of the people diverges from the ‘precepts of prophethood’ and they are as a result disunited, their inability to establish a Khilāfah caused fundamentally by the lack of righteousness in them. Although the khalifa is elected it is believed that God himself directs the hearts of believers towards an individual. Thus the khalifa is designated neither necessarily by right (i.e. the rightful or competent one in the eyes of the people at that time) nor merely by election but primarily by God.

According to Ahmadiyya thought, a khalifa need not be the head of a state; rather the Ahmadiyya community emphasises the spiritual and organisational significance of the Khilāfah. It is primarily a religious/spiritual office, with the purpose of upholding, strengthening and spreading Islam and of maintaining the high spiritual and moral standards within the global community established by Muhammad – who was not merely a political leader but primarily a religious leader. If a khalifa does happen to bear governmental authority as a head of state, it is incidental and subsidiary in relation to his overall function as khalifa which is applicable to believers transnationally and not limited to one particular state.

Ahmadi Muslims believe that God has assured them that this caliphate will endure to the end of time, depending on their righteousness and faith in God. The Khalifa provides unity, security, moral direction and progress for the community. It is required that the Khalifa carry out his duties through consultation and taking into consideration the views of the members of the Shura (consultative body). However, it is not incumbent upon him to always accept the views and recommendations of the members. The Khalifatul Masih has overall authority for all religious and organisational matters and is bound to decide and act in accordance with the Qur'an and sunnah.

Islamic call
A number of Islamist political parties and mujahideen called for the restoration of the caliphate by uniting Muslim nations, either through political action (e.g. Hizb ut-Tahrir), or through force (e.g. al-Qaeda). Various Islamist movements gained momentum in recent years with the ultimate aim of establishing a caliphate. In 2014, ISIL/ISIS made a claim to re-establishing the caliphate. Those advocating the re-establishment of a caliphate differed in their methodology and approach. Some were locally oriented, mainstream political parties that had no apparent transnational objectives.

Abul A'la Maududi believed the caliph was not just an individual ruler who had to be restored, but was man's representation of God's authority on Earth:

The Muslim Brotherhood advocates pan-Islamic unity and the implementation of Islamic law. Founder Hassan al-Banna wrote about the restoration of the caliphate.

One transnational group whose ideology was based specifically on restoring the caliphate as a pan-Islamic state is Hizb ut-Tahrir (literally, "Party of Liberation"). It is particularly strong in Central Asia and Europe and is growing in strength in the Arab world. It is based on the claim that Muslims can prove that God exists and that the Qur'an is the word of God. Hizb ut-Tahrir's stated strategy is a non-violent political and intellectual struggle.

In Southeast Asia, groups such as Jemaah Islamiyah aimed to establish a Caliphate across Indonesia, Malaysia, Brunei and parts of Thailand, the Philippines and Cambodia.

Al-Qaeda's Caliphate goals

Al-Qaeda has as one of its clearly stated goals the re-establishment of a caliphate. Its former leader, Osama bin Laden, called for Muslims to "establish the righteous caliphate of our umma". Al-Qaeda chiefs released a statement in 2005, under which, in what they call "phase five" there will be "an Islamic state, or caliphate". Al-Qaeda has named its Internet newscast from Iraq "The Voice of the Caliphate". According to author and Egyptian native Lawrence Wright, Ayman al-Zawahiri, bin Laden's mentor and al-Qaeda's second-in-command until 2011, once "sought to restore the caliphate... which had formally ended in 1924 following the dissolution of the Ottoman Empire but which had not exercised real power since the thirteenth century." Zawahiri believes that once the caliphate is re-established, Egypt would become a rallying point for the rest of the Islamic world, leading the jihad against the West. "Then history would make a new turn, God willing", Zawahiri later wrote, "in the opposite direction against the empire of the United States and the world's Jewish government".

Opposition
Scholar Olivier Roy writes that "early on, Islamists replace the concept of the caliphate ... with that of the emir." There were a number of reasons including "that according to the classical authors, a caliph must be a member of the tribe of the Prophet (the Quraysh) ... moreover, caliphs ruled societies that the Islamists do not consider to have been Islamic (the Ottoman Empire)." This is not the view of the majority of Islamist groups, as both the Muslim Brotherhood and Hizb ut-Tahrir view the Ottoman state as a caliphate.

Religious basis

Qur'an
The Quran uses the term khalifa twice. First, in al-Baqara, 30, it refers to God creating humanity as his khalifa on Earth. Second, in Sad, 26, it addresses King David as God's khalifa and reminds him of his obligation to rule with justice.

In addition, the following excerpt from the Quran, known as the 'Istikhlaf Verse', is used by some to argue for a Quranic basis for a caliphate:

In the above verse, the word Khulifa (the plural of Khalifa) has been variously translated as "successors" and "ones who accede to power".

Several schools of jurisprudence and thought within Sunni Islam argue that to govern a state by Sharia is, by definition, to rule via the caliphate and use the following verses to sustain their claim.

Hadith
The following hadith from Musnad Ahmad ibn Hanbal can be understood to prophesy two eras of the caliphate (both on the lines/precepts of prophethood).

In the above, the first era of the caliphate is commonly accepted by Muslims to be that of the Rashidun Caliphate.

Nafi'a reported saying:

Hisham ibn Urwah reported on the authority of Abu Saleh on the authority of Abu Hurairah that Muhammad said:

Muslim narrated on the authority of al-A'araj, on the authority of Abu Hurairah, that Muhammad said:

Muslim reported on the authority of Abdel Aziz al-Muqrin, who said:

Prophesied caliphate of the Mahdi

Many Islamic texts, including several ahadith, state that the Mahdi will be elected caliph and rule over a caliphate. A number of Islamic figures titled themselves both "caliph" and "al-Mahdi", including the first Abbasid caliph As-Saffah.

The Sahaba of Muhammad
Al-Habbab Ibn ul-Munthir said, when the Sahaba met in the wake of the death of Muhammad, (at the thaqifa hall) of Bani Sa’ida:  Upon this Abu Bakr replied: 

Then he got up and addressed the Muslims.

It has additionally been reported that Abu Bakr went on to say on the day of Al-Saqifa: 

The Sahaba agreed to this and selected Abu Bakr as their first Khaleef. Habbab ibn Mundhir who suggested the idea of two Ameers corrected himself and was the first to give Abu Bakr the Bay'ah. This indicates an Ijma as-Sahaba of all of the Sahaba. Ali ibni abi Talib, who was attending the body of Muhammad at the time, also consented to this.

Imam Ali whom the Shia revere said:

Views of Islamic theologians
Scholars like Al-Mawardi, Ibn Hazm, Ahmad al-Qalqashandi, and Al-Sha`rani stated that the global Muslim community can have only one leader at any given time. Al-Nawawi and Abd al-Jabbar ibn Ahmad declared it impermissible to give oaths of loyalty to more than one leader.

Al-Joziri said: 

Shia scholars have expressed similar opinions. However, the Shia school of thought states that the leader must not be appointed by the Islamic ummah, but must be appointed by God.

Al-Qurtubi said that the caliph is the "pillar upon which other pillars rest", and said of the Quranic verse, "Indeed, man is made upon this earth a Caliph":

An-Nawawi said:

Al-Ghazali when writing of the potential consequences of losing the caliphate said:

Ibn Taymiyyah said:

Government

Electing or appointing a caliph
In his book The Early Islamic Conquests (1981), Fred Donner argues that the standard Arabian practice during the early caliphates was for the prominent men of a kinship group, or tribe, to gather after a leader's death and elect a leader from amongst themselves, although there was no specified procedure for this shura, or consultative assembly. Candidates were usually from the same lineage as the deceased leader, but they were not necessarily his sons. Capable men who would lead well were preferred over an ineffectual direct heir, as there was no basis in the majority Sunni view that the head of state or governor should be chosen based on lineage alone. Since the Umayyads, all caliphates have been dynastic.

Traditionally, Sunni Muslim madhhabs all agreed that a caliph must be a descendant of the Quraysh. Al-Baqillani has said that the leader of the Muslims simply should be from the majority.

Sunni belief
Following the death of Muhammad, a meeting took place at Saqifah. At that meeting, Abu Bakr was elected caliph by the Muslim community. Sunni Muslims developed the belief that the caliph is a temporal political ruler, appointed to rule within the bounds of Islamic law (Sharia). The job of adjudicating orthodoxy and Islamic law was left to mujtahids, legal specialists collectively called the Ulama. Many Muslims call the first four caliphs the Rashidun, meaning the "Rightly Guided", because they are believed to have followed the Qur'an and the sunnah (example) of Muhammad.

Shi'a belief

With the exception of Zaidis, Shi'ites believe in the Imamate, a principle by which rulers are imams who are divinely chosen, infallible and sinless and must come from the Ahl al-Bayt regardless of majority opinion, shura or election. They claim that before his death, Muhammad had given many indications, in the hadith of the pond of Khumm in particular, that he considered Ali, his cousin and son-in-law, as his successor. For the Twelvers, Ali and his eleven descendants, the Twelve Imams, are believed to have been considered, even before their birth, as the only valid Islamic rulers appointed and decreed by God. Shia Muslims believe that all the Muslim caliphs following Muhammad's death to be illegitimate due to their unjust rule and that Muslims have no obligation to follow them, as the only guidance that was left behind, as ordained in the hadith of the two weighty things, was the Islamic holy book, the Quran and Muhammad's family and offspring, who are believed to be infallible, therefore able to lead society and the Muslim community with complete justice and equity. The Prophet's own grandson, and third Shia imam, Hussain ibn Ali led an uprising against injustice and the oppressive rule of the Muslim caliph at the time at the Battle of Karbala. Shia Muslims emphasise that values of social justice, and speaking out against oppression and tyranny are not merely moral values, but values essential to a person's religiosity.

After these Twelve Imams, the potential caliphs, had passed, and in the absence of the possibility of a government headed by their imams, some Twelvers believe it was necessary that a system of Shi'i Islamic government based on the Guardianship of the Islamic Jurist be developed, due to the need for some form of government, where an Islamic jurist or faqih rules Muslims, suffices. However, this idea, developed by the marja' Ayatollah Ruhollah Khomeini and established in Iran, is not universally accepted among the Shia.

Ismailis believe in the Imamate principle mentioned above, but they need not be secular rulers as well.
 The Nizari continue to have a living imam; the current imam is the Aga Khan.
 The Taiyabi Ismaili have, since the year 1130, followed the imam's chief officer, the Dai al-Mutlaq, as they believe the imams are in a state of hiding.

Majlis al-Shura

The Majlis al-Shura (literally "consultative assembly") was a representation of the idea of consultative governance. The importance of this is premised by the following verses of the Qur'an:
 
 

The majlis is also the means to elect a new caliph. Al-Mawardi has written that members of the majlis should satisfy three conditions: they must be just, have enough knowledge to distinguish a good caliph from a bad one and have sufficient wisdom and judgement to select the best caliph. Al-Mawardi also said that in emergencies when there is no caliphate and no majlis, the people themselves should create a majlis and select a list of candidates for caliph; then the majlis should select a caliph from the list of candidates.

Some Islamist interpretations of the role of the Majlis al-Shura are the following: In an analysis of the shura chapter of the Qur'an, Islamist author Sayyid Qutb argues that Islam only requires the ruler to consult with some of the representatives of the ruled and govern within the context of the Sharia. Taqiuddin al-Nabhani, the founder of a transnational political movement devoted to the revival of the caliphate, writes that although the Shura is an important part of "the ruling structure" of the Islamic caliphate, "(it is) not one of its pillars", meaning that its neglect would not make a Caliph's rule un-Islamic such as to justify a rebellion. However, the Muslim Brotherhood, the largest Islamic movement in Egypt, has toned down these Islamist views by accepting in principle that in the modern age the Majlis al-Shura is democracy.

Accountability of rulers
Al-Mawardi said that if the rulers meet their Islamic responsibilities to the public the people must obey their laws, but a caliph or ruler who becomes either unjust or severely ineffective must be impeached via the Majlis al-Shura. Al-Juwayni argued that Islam is the goal of the ummah, so any ruler who deviates from this goal must be impeached. Al-Ghazali believed that oppression by a caliph is sufficient grounds for impeachment. Rather than just relying on impeachment, Ibn Hajar al-Asqalani stated that the people have an obligation to rebel if the caliph begins to act with no regard for Islamic law. Ibn Hajar al-Asqalani said that to ignore such a situation is haraam and those who cannot revolt from inside the caliphate should launch a struggle from outside. Al-Asqalani used two ayahs from the Qur'an to justify this:

Islamic lawyers commented that when the rulers refuse to step down after being impeached through the Majlis, becoming dictators through the support of a corrupt army, if the majority is in agreement they have the option to launch a revolution. Many noted that this option is to be exercised only after factoring in the potential cost of life.

Rule of law

The following hadith establishes the principle of rule of law in relation to nepotism and accountability

Various Islamic lawyers, however, place multiple conditions and stipulations on the execution of such a law, making it difficult to implement. For example, the poor cannot be penalised for stealing out of poverty, and during a time of drought in the Rashidun caliphate, capital punishment was suspended until the effects of the drought passed.

Islamic jurists later formulated the concept that all classes were subject to the law of the land, and no person is above the law; officials and private citizens alike have a duty to obey the same law. Furthermore, a Qadi (Islamic judge) was not allowed to discriminate on the grounds of religion, race, colour, kinship or prejudice. In a number of cases, Caliphs had to appear before judges as they prepared to render their verdict.

According to Noah Feldman, a law professor at Harvard University, the system of legal scholars and jurists responsible for the rule of law was replaced by the codification of Sharia by the Ottoman Empire in the early 19th century:

Economy

During the Muslim Agricultural Revolution, the caliphate understood that real incentives were needed to increase productivity and wealth and thus enhance tax revenues. A social transformation took place as a result of changing land ownership giving individuals of any gender, ethnic or religious background the right to buy, sell, mortgage and inherit land for farming or any other purpose. Signatures were required on contracts for every major financial transaction concerning agriculture, industry, commerce and employment. Copies of the contract were usually kept by both parties involved.

Early forms of proto-capitalism and free markets were present in the caliphate, since an early market economy and early form of merchant capitalism developed between the 8th and 12th centuries, which some refer to as "Islamic capitalism". A vigorous monetary economy developed based on the circulation of a stable high-value currency (the dinar) and the integration of previously independent monetary areas. Business techniques and forms of business organisation employed during this time included early contracts, bills of exchange, long-distance international trade, early forms of partnership (mufawada) such as limited partnerships (mudaraba) and early forms of credit, debt, profit, loss, capital (al-mal), capital accumulation (nama al-mal), circulating capital, capital expenditure, revenue, cheques, promissory notes, trusts (waqf), startup companies, savings accounts, transactional accounts, pawning, loaning, exchange rates, bankers, money changers, ledgers, deposits, assignments, the double-entry bookkeeping system, and lawsuits. Organisational enterprises similar to corporations independent from the state also existed in the medieval Islamic world. Many of these concepts were adopted and further advanced in medieval Europe from the 13th century onwards.

Early Islamic law included collection of Zakat (charity), one of the Five Pillars of Islam, since the time of the first Islamic State, established by Allah's Messenger at Medina. The taxes (including Zakat and Jizya) collected in the treasury (Bayt al-mal) of an Islamic government were used to provide income for the needy, including the poor, elderly, orphans, widows and the disabled. During the caliphate of Abu Bakr, a number of the Arab tribes, who had accepted Islam at the hand of The Prophet Muhammad, rebelled and refused to continue to pay the Zakat, leading to the Ridda Wars. Caliph Umar added to the duties of the state an allowance, paid on behalf of every man woman and child, starting at birth, creating the world's first state run social welfare program.
 
Maya Shatzmiller states that the demographic behaviour of medieval Islamic society varied in some significant respects from other agricultural societies. Nomadic groups within places like the deserts of Egypt and Morocco maintained high birth rates compared to rural and urban populations, though periods of extremely high nomadic birth rates seem to have occurred in occasional "surges" rather than on a continuous basis. Individuals living in large cities had much lower birth rates, possibly due to the use of birth control methods and political or economic instability. This led to population declines in some regions. While several studies have shown that Islamic scholars enjoyed a life expectancy of 59–75 years between the eleventh and thirteenth centuries, the overall life expectancy of men in the same societies was lower. Factoring in infant mortality, Lawrence Conrad estimates the average lifespan in the early Islamic caliphate to be above 35 years for the general population, compared to around 40 years for the population of Classical Greece and 31 years for the population of thirteenth century England.

The early Islamic Empire also had the highest literacy rates among pre-modern societies, alongside the city of classical Athens in the 4th century BC, and later, China after the introduction of printing from the 10th century. One factor for the relatively high literacy rates in the early Islamic Empire was its parent-driven educational marketplace, as the state did not systematically subsidise educational services until the introduction of state funding under Nizam al-Mulk in the 11th century. Another factor was the diffusion of paper from China, which led to an efflorescence of books and written culture in Islamic society; thus papermaking technology transformed Islamic society (and later, the rest of Afro-Eurasia) from an oral to scribal culture, comparable to the later shifts from scribal to typographic culture, and from typographic culture to the Internet. Other factors include the widespread use of paper books in Islamic society (more so than any other previously existing society), the study and memorisation of the Qur'an, flourishing commercial activity and the emergence of the Maktab and Madrasah educational institutions.

Notable caliphs

 Rashidun ("Righteously Guided")
 Abu Bakr, first Rashidun caliph. Subdued rebel tribes in the Ridda wars.
 Umar (Umar ibn al-Khattab), second Rashidun caliph. During his reign, the Islamic empire expanded to include Egypt, Jerusalem and Persia.
 Uthman, (Uthman ibn Affan) third Rashidun caliph, When Caliph Umar died in office aged 59/60 years, Uthman, aged 64/65 years, succeeded him and was the second oldest to rule as caliph. Under Uthman's leadership, the Islamic empire expanded into Fars (present-day Iran) in 650, and some areas of Khorasan (present-day Afghanistan) in 651. The conquest of Armenia had begun by the 640s.
 Ali (Ali ibn Abu Talib), fourth Rashidun caliph. Considered by Shi'a Muslims however to be the first imam. His reign was fraught with internal conflict, with Muawiyah ibn Abi Sufyan (Muawiyah I) and Amr ibn al-As controlling the Levant and Egypt regions independently of Ali.
 Hasan ibn Ali, fifth caliph. Considered as "rightly guided" by several historians. He abdicated his right to the caliphate in favour of Muawiyah I in order to end the potential for ruinous civil war.
 "Umayyad Caliphate"
Muawiyah I, the first caliph of the Umayyad dynasty. Muawiyah instituted dynastic rule by appointing his son Yazid I as his successor, a trend that would continue through subsequent caliphates.
 Abd al-Malik was the fifth Umayyad caliph, ruling from April 685 until his death in 705. A member of the first generation of born Muslims, his early life in Medina was occupied with pious pursuits. He held administrative and military posts under Caliph Mu'awiya I (r. 661–680) and his own father, Caliph Marwan I (r. 684–685).
 Al-Walid I was the sixth Umayyad caliph, ruling from October 705 until his death. He was the eldest son of his predecessor Caliph Abd al-Malik.
 Umar ibn Abd al-Aziz (Umar II), Umayyad caliph who is considered one of the finest rulers in Muslim history. He is also considered by some (mainly Sunnis) to be among the "rightly guided" caliphs.
 Yazid II was the ninth Umayyad caliph, ruling from February 720 until his death in 724.
 Hisham was the tenth Umayyad caliph who ruled from 724 until his death in 743. Hisham was a great patron of the arts, and he again encouraged arts in the empire. He also encouraged the growth of education by building more schools, and perhaps most importantly, by overseeing the translation of numerous literary and scientific masterpieces into Arabic. He returned to a stricter interpretation of the Sharia as Umar had, and enforced it, even upon his own family.
 Al-Walid II was an Umayyad caliph who ruled from 743 until his death in the year 744.
 Yazid III was the twelfth Umayyad caliph. He reigned for six months, from 15 April to 3 or 4 October 744, and died in that office.
 Marwan II was the fourteenth and last Umayyad caliph, ruling from 744 until his death in 750.
 "Abbasid Caliphate"
 As-Saffah was the first caliph of the Abbasid caliphate, one of the longest and most important caliphates (Islamic dynasties) in Islamic history.
 Al-Mansur was the second Abbasid caliph reigning from 136 AH to 158 AH (754–775) and succeeding his brother al-Saffah. Al-Mansur is generally regarded as the greatest caliph of the Abbasid dynasty. He is also known for founding the 'round city' of Madinat al-Salam which was to become the core of imperial Baghdad
 Al-Mahdi was the third Abbasid caliph who reigned from 775 to his death in 785.
 Harun al-Rashid, Abbasid caliph during whose reign Baghdad became the world's prominent centre of trade, learning and culture. Harun is the subject of many stories in the famous One Thousand and One Nights.
 Al-Ma'mun, a great Abbasid patron of Islamic philosophy and science
 Al-Mu'tasim was the eighth Abbasid caliph, ruling from 833 until his death in 842. The younger son of Caliph Harun al-Rashid. He is also known for founding the city of Samarra.
 Al-Mutawakkil was the tenth Abbasid caliph who reigned from 847 until 861. He was the son of al-Mu'tasim. He is considered an influential Abbasid caliph.
 Al-Mu'tadid was the caliph of the Abbasid Caliphate from 892 until his death in 902.
 Ar-Radi was the twentieth Abbasid caliph, reigning from 934 to his death. He died on 23 December 940 at the age of 31. He is considered the last caliph of early Abbasid period.
 Al-Qadir, famous caliph of later Abbasid period, 991–1031.
 Al-Muqtafi, famous caliph of later Abbasid period, who reigned 1136–1160.
 Al-Nasir was the Abbasid caliph in Baghdad from 1180 until his death in 1225. According to the historian, Angelika Hartmann, Al-Nasir was the last effective later Abbasid caliph.
 Al-Musta'sim was the 37th and last Abbasid caliph to rule from Baghdad. He ruled from 1242 until his death in 1258.
"Ottoman Caliphate"
 Selim I, the 9th Sultan, the 1st caliph and maiden title holder of "Custodian of the Two Holy Mosques" of the Ottoman Empire. Under his reign, the Empire grew by seventy per cent.
 Suleiman the Magnificent, the 2nd Ottoman caliph, during whose reign the Ottoman Empire reached its zenith
 Ahmed I, the 8th Ottoman caliph, who is well known for his construction of the Blue Mosque, one of the most famous mosques and tourist attraction in Turkey. 
 Abdul Hamid II, the 25th and the last Ottoman caliph to rule with independent, absolute power
 Mehmed V, the 26th Ottoman caliph, who made the Ottoman Empire enter into World War I in 1914, which would ultimately lead to the Empire's end.
 Abdulmejid II, the 28th and the last caliph of the Ottoman dynasty. Nominally the 37th Head of the Ottoman dynasty. In 1924, Grand National Assembly of Turkey abolished the Ottoman Caliphate and sent Mejid in exile.

See also

References

Citations

Sources

Further reading
The theory of government in Islam, by The Internet Islamic University
The History of Al-Khilafah Ar-Rashidah (The Rightly Guided Caliphates) School Textbook, By Dr. 'Abdullah al-Ahsan, `Abdullah Ahsan
The Crisis of the Early Caliphate By Richard Stephen Humphreys, Stephen (EDT) Humphreys from The History of al-Tabari
The Reunification of the Abbasid Caliphate By Clifford Edmund (TRN) Bosworth, from The History of al-Tabari
Return of the Caliphate to Baghdad By Franz Rosenthal from The History of al-Tabari
Pan-Islamism: Indian Muslims, the Ottomans and Britain (1877–1924) By Azmi Özcan
Baghdad during the Abbasid Caliphate from Contemporary Arabic and Persian Sources By Guy Le Strange
The Fall of the Caliphate of Cordoba: Berbers and Andalusis in conflict By Peter C. Scales
Khilafat and Caliphate, By Mubasher Ahmad
The abolition of the Caliphate, From The Economist 8 March 1924
The Clash of the Caliphates: Understanding the real war of ideas, by Tony Corn, Small Wars Journal, March 2011 
Hüseyin Yılmaz. Caliphate Redefined: The Mystical Turn in Ottoman Political Thought. Princeton University Press, 2018. .

External links

The Caliph – a three-part documentary by Al Jazeera English
The return of the caliphate, The Guardian.
Islamists urge caliphate revival, BBC News.

 
Islamic states by type
Pan-Islamism
Religious leadership roles
Islamic terminology